Constantine Murray (born 8 May 1932) was a Scottish footballer who played for Forfar Athletic and Dumbarton.

References

1932 births
Living people
Scottish footballers
Dumbarton F.C. players
Forfar Athletic F.C. players
Scottish Football League players
Place of birth missing (living people)
Association football goalkeepers